Fossiliferous limestone is any type of limestone, made mostly of calcium carbonate (CaCO3) in the form of the minerals calcite or aragonite, that contains an abundance of fossils or fossil traces. The fossils in these rocks may be of macroscopic or microscopic size. The sort of macroscopic fossils often include crinoid stems, brachiopods, gastropods, and other hard shelled mollusk remains.

In some cases, microfossils such as siliceous diatom shells in deposition may convert over time to opal and chert, providing the only inferred evidence of bioactivity preserved in limestone. 

Fossiliferous limestone is termed biosparite limestone under the Folk classification of sedimentary rocks.

Lagerstätte are a class of fossil bearing rocks that includes fossiliferous limestone.

Use
Fossils in general provide geologic clues to the environment of deposition, rock formation,  and the types of biological activities present at the time. Index fossils are more helpful in providing geologic references or reference markers.

When polished as tiles or slabs, fossil bearing rocks are used as attractive building facades and pavements. They are also carved as ornamental stones, and used in jewelry making.

Common rock types
Carboniferous limestone
Coquina
Coral rag
Coral sand
Fossil beach
Shelly limestone
Keystone

Less fossil bearing types
Lithographic limestone
Marl
Millstone
Plattenkalk
Tufa

Geological layers

Alum Bluff Formation
Angoumian
Arenig
Bioclast
Biostratigraphy
Blue Lias
Carnian
Chalk Group
Ediacara biota
Elk Point Group
Eramosa
Galena Group
Hirnantian
La Tour-Blanche Anticline
Mannville Group
Madison Group
Mareuil Anticline
Marcellus Formation
Morrison Formation
Orsten
Ostracod Beds
Redknife Formation
Red River Formation
Rock-cut basin
Stoddart Group
Tithonian
Wenlock Group
White Limestone Formation

Locations on Earth

Alquézar
Aquitaine Basin
Aymestry Limestone
Barstow Formation
Bear Gulch Limestone
Bennett Island
Bissett Formation
Bladen Nature Reserve
Bluegrass Region
Boodjamulla National Park
Borschiv
Bullock Creek
Bunda Cliffs
Bungonia State Recreation Area
Caves of the Tullybrack and Belmore hills
Cedar Mountain Formation
Chazy Formation
Chestnut Ridge, Bedford County
Chocolate Hills
Colemans Quarry
Columbus Limestone
Coniston Limestone
Coon Creek Formation
Cowan Lake (Ohio)
Crab Island (Lake Champlain)
Cradle of Humankind
Crato Formation
Cumnor Hurst
Cunswick Scar
Dinosaur Valley State Park
Durupınar site
Dudley Tunnel
East Kirkton Quarry
Elliot Formation
English Riviera Geopark
Falls of the Ohio State Park
Front Range
Gem Valley
Geology of Australia
Geology of the Canyonlands area
Geology of the Capitol Reef area
Geology of the Dallas–Fort Worth Metroplex
Geology of Ethiopia
Geology of the Grand Canyon area
Geology of the Grand Teton area
Geology of the Iberian Peninsula
Geology of Nepal
Geology of the Pyrenees
Geology of Somerset
Geology of the Zion and Kolob canyons area
Gilwern Hill, Powys
Glen Rose Formation
Gurney Slade quarry
Haile Quarry site
Halecombe
Hamilton Group
Hawkesbury Quarry
Hessilhead Limestone
Hill Country State Natural Area
Hotavlje
House Range
Humpback Rock
Hunstanton
Indiana Limestone
Isle La Motte, Vermont
Ixkun
John Boyd Thacher State Park
Kaibab Limestone
Kakanui
Kennetcook River
Keyser Formation
Kotelny Island
Latyan Dam
Lincolnshire limestone
Llandovery Group
Madar, Yemen
Majlis al Jinn
Michigan Basin
Middridge Quarry
Mooreville Chalk Formation
Mortimer Forest
Mugarra
Naracoorte Caves National Park
Neckar
Notch Peak
Nullarbor Plain
Old Rag Mountain
Onondaga Formation
Ottawa Valley
Owl's Hill Nature Center
Öland
Palm Islands Nature Reserve
Paluxy River
Penmon
Perth Basin
Pipe Creek Sinkhole
Purbeck Limestone Formation
Riversleigh
Rock Point Provincial Park
Sacul, El Petén
St. Louis Limestone
Santana Formation
Solnhofen Plattenkalk
Somervell County, Texas
Stephen Formation
Suwannee Limestone
Swartkrans
Tamiami Formation
Taynton Limestone Formation
Tennessee marble
Torreya Formation
Tyndall Limestone
Upper Elliot Formation
Walcott-Rust quarry
Warrior Formation
Washtenaw Community College
Weardale
Wetterstein limestone
Wills Creek Formation
Wren's Nest
Zhoukoudian
Zitai Formation

See also
List of types of limestone

Limestone